Jennifer Laura Thompson (born December 5, 1969) is an American actress and singer, best known for her theatrical performances. She originated the role of Cynthia Murphy in the Tony Award-winning musical, Dear Evan Hansen, and received a Tony Award nomination for her performance as Hope Cladwell in Urinetown. She is also known for being the first replacement for Kristen Chenoweth as Glinda in Wicked on Broadway.

Career
Thompson made her Broadway debut in 1998 as Ariel Moore in the original cast of Footloose. She also originated the role of Hope Cladwell in both the off-Broadway and Broadway productions of Urinetown. She received a Tony Award nomination for the 2002 Best Leading Actress in a Musical category for her performance as Hope in Urinetown; the award went to Sutton Foster for her performance in Thoroughly Modern Millie.

Thompson is also well known for being the first replacement actress for the role of Glinda in the Broadway hit musical Wicked at the Gershwin Theatre. Her first performance replacing Kristin Chenoweth was on July 20, 2004, and continued in the role for over ten months. During her run as Glinda, she performed opposite Idina Menzel and Shoshana Bean as Elphaba. She departed the company on May 29, 2005. She was replaced by Megan Hilty, who had served as her standby. Thompson would later return to the theatre on October 27, 2008, to take part in a one-off performance titled "The Yellow Brick Road Not Taken", a presentation of rough scenes and songs cut from early drafts of Wicked.

Off-Broadway, Thompson played the lead role of Charlotte in the Michael John LaChiusa musical, Little Fish at the Second Stage Theatre. She also appeared in A Doll's Life at the York Theatre, Good News at the Westchester Broadway Theatre (as Connie), Pardon My English, Strike up the Band!, and most recently, Of Thee I Sing for City Center Encores!, and Tip-Toes at Carnegie Hall. She played Julie Jordan in the first national tour of Carousel, and appeared in national tours for Jesus Christ Superstar (as Mary) and The Music of Andrew Lloyd Webber. Regionally, she has played roles such as Laura in The Glass Menagerie, Corie in Barefoot in the Park and Luisa in The Fantasticks. She has also made a guest appearance on television's Law & Order: Special Victims Unit.

She also starred in the Encores! production of On the Town which ran from November 19 to 23, 2008.

Thompson starred as Diana in the Broadway revival of Lend Me a Tenor, which officially opened April 4, 2010, at the Music Box Theatre.

On December 17, 2010, it was announced that she would be featured in the premiere of the musical version of the film Little Miss Sunshine at the La Jolla Playhouse in La Jolla, California. The musical ran at La Jolla from February 15 through March 27, 2011, with Thompson in the role of Sheryl Hoover. She did not play in the Off-Broadway production (which ran in November to December 2013).

Thompson starred as Eileen Evergreen in the musical Nice Work If You Can Get It, which opened on Broadway in spring 2012 at the Imperial Theatre.

Thompson has also starred in the role of Cynthia Murphy in the Broadway production of Dear Evan Hansen at the Music Box Theatre from December 4, 2016 to August 4, 2019.

Personal life
Thompson has a husband, John Kain, and a son, Thomas. She attended and graduated from Birmingham Groves High School in 1987.  She graduated from the University of Michigan with a Bachelor of Fine Arts in Musical Theatre in 1991.

Theatre credits

Filmography

Films

Television

Awards and nominations

References

External links

Jennifer Laura Thompson Interview by Beth Stevens on Broadway.com

1969 births
Actresses from Michigan
American stage actresses
American television actresses
American musical theatre actresses
Grammy Award winners
Living people
People from Southfield, Michigan
University of Michigan School of Music, Theatre & Dance alumni
21st-century American women